Karaikudi is a Greater municipality in Sivagangai district in the Indian state of Tamil Nadu. It is the 21st largest urban agglomeration of Tamil Nadu based on 2011 census data. It is part of the area commonly referred to as "Chettinad" and has been declared a Municipality by the Government of Tamil Nadu, on account of the palatial houses built with limestone called karai veedu.

Karaikudi comes under the Karaikudi Assembly constituency, which elects a member to the Tamil Nadu Legislative Assembly once every five years, and it is a part of the Sivaganga Lok Sabha constituency, which elects its member of parliament (MP) once in five years. As of 2011, The town had a population of 181,851 of which 90,799 were males and 91,052 were females in 2011. The municipality consists of karaikudi, Kanadukathan, Kandanur, Kottaiyur, Pallathur, Puduvayal, and Sankarapuram (census town)

This city is famous for karaikudi kandangi sarees a special type of sarees which come from and are woven in this area.The geographical indication presents the government of India of this kandaangi sarees.

History

The city derives its name from the thorny plant Karai, referred to in ancient literature as Karaikudi, which in modern times has become Karaikudi. The town was established in the 19th century, and the oldest known structure is the Koppudaiya Nayagi Amman Temple.
Mahatma Gandhi delivered two speeches in Karaikudi in 1927 and Bharathiyar visited Karaikudi in 1919 to participate in an event. After independence, the city saw significant growth in the industrial sector. Karaikudi and surrounding areas are generally referred as "Chettinad". Chettinad comprises a network of 73 villages and 2 towns forming clusters spread over a territory of 1,550 km2 in the Districts of Sivagangai and Pudukottai in the State of Tamil Nadu. Karaikudi is the largest town in Chettinad. Karaikudi and surrounding areas are very popular for their unique palaces, Chettinad Architecture. 
Kannadasan Manimandapam, Kamban Manimandapam and Thousand windows house are other visitor attractions in Karaikudi.

The first Temple for Mother Tamil, Tamil Thai Kovil is located in Karaikudi and was established in 1993.

Demographics 
According to 2011 census, Karaikkudi had a population of 181,125 with a sex-ratio of 1,000 females for every 1,000 males, much above the national average of 929. A total of 19,619 children were under the age of six, constituting 10,405 males and 10,214 females. The average literacy rate of the town was 81.48%, compared to the national average of 72.99%. The town had a total of 47504 households. There were a total of 60,069 workers, comprising 244 cultivators, 314 main agricultural labourers, 1,303 in household industries, 30,836 other workers, 17,372 marginal workers, 162 marginal cultivators, 2496 marginal agricultural labourers, 1345 marginal workers in household industries and 9,469 other marginal workers.   In Karaikudi, Hinduism is the majority religion with 83.9% of the total population, followed by Islam, 11.39%, Christianity, 4.3%, Jainism, 0.05%, Sikism, 0.01% and Others, the rest.

Geography
Karaikudi is located in Sivagangai district of Tamil Nadu State. The Trichy–Rameswaram Highway passes through Karaikudi. The Thennar River flows through South Karaikudi. The terrain of Karaikudi is predominantly flat. Rocky areas are found in the surrounding areas of Karaikudi town with more rocks towards the western side of the town. The soil is of the hard red lateritic type and is not suitable for cultivation. Since the 1970s, the water supply of the Karaikudi residents has depended on the deeper aquifers.

Administration and politics

Karaikudi was constituted as a municipality in 1928 and was upgraded to a Grade II Municipality in 1973, to Selection Grade in 1988, to special grade in 2013.The area of the city is about 13.75 km2, comprising the revenue villages of Kalanivasal, Sekkalai kottai, Elappakudi Area, Ariyakudi Area and Senjai. The Karaikudi municipality has 36 wards and there is an elected councillor for each of those wards. The functions of the municipality are devolved into six departments: general administration/personnel, Engineering, Revenue, Public Health, city planning and Information Technology (IT). The legislative powers are vested in a body of 36 members, one each from the 36 wards. The legislative body is headed by an elected Chairperson assisted by a Deputy Chairperson.

Karaikudi is a part of the Karaikudi assembly constituency and it elects a member to the Tamil Nadu Legislative Assembly once every five years.  The current member of the legislative assembly is S. Mangudi from INC party. Karaikudi is a part of the Sivaganga Lok Sabha constituency. The current Member of Parliament from the constituency is Karti Chidambaram from the INC.

Law and order in the city is maintained by the Sivaganga sub division of the Tamil Nadu Police headed by a Deputy Superintendent. There are three police stations in the city as North police station, south police station, Azhagappapuram police station are mainly being an all-women police station and town police station. There are special units like prohibition enforcement, district crime, social justice and human rights, district crime records and special branch that operate at the district level police division headed by a Superintendent of Police.

Culture

Landmarks

Some prominent temples around the city are: 
Karaikudi Nagara Sivan Kovil, located at the center city of Karaikudi, built by Nagarathars/Chettiars in according to Dravidian Temple architecture
Koppudaiya Amman Kovil, Kallukatti,  Temple in Karaikudi 
Thirumayam fort 20 km away from the city
Thousand window house, Kanadukathan palace, Athangudi palace, Kannadasan manimandapam, Kamban manimandapam, Azhagappar museum, Sankarapathi fort are other tourist attractions in the city
The very famous Chettinad cuisine originated in the areas around Karaikudi.

Economy
Karaikudi is a developing urban center in Sivaganga district in Tamil Nadu. UNESCO has offered to set up a Chettinad Heritage Museum in Sivaganga district recognizing the unique style of architecture in the region.
 Chettinad Kottan are palm leaf baskets woven by the women of the region. Chettinad Kottan has been noted for its unique style and colors and was granted a Geographical Indication tag in 2013. Chettinadu Kandangi sarees are a popular type of sarees produced in the region.* In these area around 250 rice mills and paper mills located in puduvayal and pallathur are the sub urban region of karaikudi is one of the trade and commercial economical growth area. It is also called as second rice bowl of Tamil Nadu. Athangudi tiles are basically cement tiles like mosaic used for building the palatial houses in the town and in modern times, is a source for handicraft industry. Indian Overseas Bank was founded on 10 February 1937 in Karaikudi by M. Ct. M. Chidambaram Chettyar.

Transport

By Air
Nearby airports include Tiruchirapalli International Airport and Madurai International Airport.

Though this city is well connected by roadways and railways. This town also has an unused airstrip called Chettinad airport also known as Karaikudi airport. This old British era airfield had been used during the world war 2. The government of India is planning to reopen this airfield under the UDAN scheme

By Rail
Karaikudi Junction railway station is a major rail head serves the city and Devakottai road Railway station, kottaiyur Railway station, 
Chettinad Railway station, Kandanur puduvayal Railway station are the stations around the city.

By Road
The town has two bus terminals namely "Rajaji Bus-stand" aka Old Bus terminal and new bus terminal. Buses that connect the Karaikudi city, nearby villages and smaller towns terminate at the Old bus-stand. The State Transport Corporation Buses To:Chennai, Bangalore, Coimbatore, Madurai, Trichy and near by cities run moffusil buses terminate at the New bus-stand Karaikudi Bus Terminal.

Education and utility services
As of 2011, there were government schools and many private schools in Karaikudi and Alagappa university colleges, many private colleges in the city. Alagappa University is located in this town and Alagappa Chettiar College of Engineering and Technology is the oldest college here and was established in 1953. Alagappa Government Polytechnic College and Annamalai Polytechnic Colleges are located in Karaikudi area. 

Electricity supply to Karaikudi is regulated and distributed by the Tamil Nadu Electricity Board (TNEB). The town along with its suburbs forms the Sivaganga Electricity Distribution Circle. Water supply is provided by the Karaikudi Municipality from seven borewells is located at Sambai Oothu (Artesian aquifer). As per the municipal data for 2011, about 45 metric tonnes of solid waste were collected. The underground drainage system in the city is on board at process and the sewerage system for disposal of sullage is through septic tanks, open drains and public conveniences. As of 2011, there was one government hospital and 13 private hospitals in the town. The municipality operates one daily market namely the Anna Daily Market and there are three weekly markets (Uzhavar Santhai) that cater to the needs of the town and the rural areas around it.

References

External links 
 
 Sivaganga District Administration

 
Cities and towns in Sivaganga district